The Grand Quartier Général (GQG or Grand QG) was the French Army's high command during times of war.  There were two separate instances:

Grand Quartier Général (1914–1919) during the First World War
Grand Quartier Général (1939–1940) during the Second World War

In addition the Grand Quartier Général des Puissances Alliées en Europe is the French name for the Supreme Headquarters Allied Powers Europe

French Army